Žďár is a municipality and village in Písek District in the South Bohemian Region of the Czech Republic. It has about 300 inhabitants.

Administrative parts
Villages of Nová Ves u Protivína and Žďárské Chalupy are administrative parts of Žďár.

References

Villages in Písek District